Patera is a genus of land snails in the family Polygyridae.

The name is from the Latin patera ("a saucer"), and refers to the highly depressed, saucer-like shape of the shells of these snails. In addition to flattened shells, members of the group have an imperforate umbilicus and a single tooth on the parietal wall of the aperture.

These snails are known only from the eastern United States.

Species
Species include:
Patera appressa – flat bladetooth   
Patera binneyana – half-lidded oval   
Patera clarki – dwarf proud globe   
 Patera clarki clarki
 Patera clarki nantahala – noonday globe
Patera clenchi – Calico Rock oval, Clench's middle-toothed land snail   
Patera indianorum – lidded oval   
Patera kiowaensis – drywoods oval   
Patera laevior – smooth bladetooth   
Patera leatherwoodi – Pedernales oval   
Patera panselenus – Virginia bladetooth   
Patera pennsylvanica – proud globelet   
Patera perigrapta – engraved bladetooth   
Patera roemeri – Texas oval   
Patera sargentiana – grand bladetooth

References

Polygyridae
Fauna of the Eastern United States